Salm Island is a roughly round-shaped island in Franz Josef Land, Arkhangelsk Oblast, Russia.

Salm Island was named by the Austro-Hungarian North Pole Expedition after the Salm-Hoogstraten aristocratic dynasty to which Count Karl Alexander, one of the expedition's main sponsors, belonged.

Geography
Salm Island is almost completely glacierized except for two headlands in its western and its southern shore. The Chernyshev Ice Cap (Lednik Chernysheva) covers most of the island. The highest point of the island is 343 m high summit of the Chernyshev Ice Cap.

Adjacent smaller islands
Salm Island is surrounded by smaller islands. Ostrova Bisernyye are two small islets located right off Salm Island's southern shore.

Wilczek Island
This island is named after Austro-Hungarian nobleman Johann Nepomuk Graf Wilczek.

Lütke Island 
 southeast of Salm Island lies small and round Lütke Island (остров Литке).

Hochstetter Islands
The Hochstetter Islands are named after the German Hochstetter princely dynasty of the Austro Hungarian Empire.

Koldewey Island
Highest point 66 m.

Schoenau Island
Off Koldewey Island's northern point lies the smaller Schoenau Island (остров Шёнау). This island was named after Teplitz-Schönau (now Teplice, Czech Republic), the birthplace of Austro-Hungarian arctic explorer Julius Payer, who made the discovery of Franz Josef Land, when he led, as Commander at Shore, the Austro-Hungarian North Pole Expedition together with Commander at Sea Karl Weyprecht.

See also
 Complete island list in Russian: :ru:Список островов России

References

External links
 All locations

Islands of Franz Josef Land
Ice caps of Russia